Oba Ikama Ulitch (born 2 February 2000) is a Congolese professional footballer who plays as a forward for Tunisian Premier League side US Ben Guerdane.

Club career

AS Ponténégrine 
Ulitch played for Congolese team AS Ponténégrine before joining Aduana Stars in 2017.

Aduana Stars 
Ulitch joined Ghanaian club Aduana Stars on 16 December 2017 ahead of the 2018 Ghana Premier League and the 2018 CAF Champions League campaign. He signed a three-year deal with the Dormaa-based club. He made his debut on 10 May 2018, full 90 minutes and in the process scoring his debut goal as well in the 12th minute to help secure a 3–2 win over Liberty Professionals. He was adjudged the man of the match at the end of the match. Due to the abandonment of the league due to the dissolution of the GFA in June 2018, which came about as a result of the Anas Number 12 Expose, he ranked five league appearances and scored a goal. He went on to play 5 matches during the 2019 GFA Normalization Committee Special Competition.

International career 
Ulitch is a former member of the Congo national under-20 football team.

References

External links 

 
 

Living people
2000 births
Association football forwards
Republic of the Congo footballers
Aduana Stars F.C. players
US Ben Guerdane players
Ghana Premier League players